is a river in Hokkaidō, Japan. Because of its volcanic origin, the water temperature reaches .

Course
The Kamuiwakka River rises on the slopes of Mount Iō on the Shiretoko Peninsula. It flows Northwest until it reaches the Pacific Ocean. Kamuiwakka Falls are on the Kamuiwakka River.

References

Rivers of Hokkaido
Rivers of Japan